Novokolpakovo is a rural locality (a selo) in Bolshepanyushevsky Selsoviet, Aleysky District, Altai Krai, Russia. The population was 91 as of 2013. There are 8 streets.

Geography 
Novokolpakovo is located on the Aley River, 19 km northeast of Aleysk (the district's administrative centre) by road. Bezgolosovo and Bolshepanyushevo are the nearest rural localities.

References 

Rural localities in Aleysky District